is a Japanese voice actress affiliated with Tokyo Actor's Consumer's Cooperative Society.

Biography

Filmography

Anime series
2013
Detective Conan, Saleslady
Magi: The Labyrinth of Magic, Child B
Nagi-Asu: A Lull in the Sea, Hama Junior High student B, Nurse
2014
A Good Librarian Like a Good Shepherd, Schoolgirl C
Bladedance of Elementalers, Dera
Celestial Method, Student
Shirobako, Aoi Miyamori, Mimuji and Roro, Besobeso (ep 19)
Detective Conan, Woman, Flower shop clerk, Family restaurant clerk
The Fruit of Grisaia, Operator 2
2015
Food Wars!: Shokugeki no Soma, Female secretary, Service sector women A, Female narrator
Gangsta., as Radio voice
Is It Wrong to Try to Pick Up Girls in a Dungeon?, Lefiya Viridis
Hello!! Kin-iro Mosaic, Schoolgirl A
JoJo's Bizarre Adventure: Stardust Crusaders Egypt Arc, Nurse B, Woman, Sonia Doll, Clerk
Mikagura School Suite, Eruna Ichinomiya
Plastic Memories, Secretary
School-Live!, Kei Shidō
Shimoneta: A Boring World Where the Concept of Dirty Jokes Doesn’t Exist, Girl D
Symphogear GX, Announcer
Tantei Kageki Milky Holmes TD, Harmony (black)
The Rolling Girls, Mario, Aichi Tenmusu member (ep 5), Customer, Fukuai
Venus Project: Climax, Horus Omori
Wakaba Girl, Yuzuha Kohashi
The Idolmaster Cinderella Girls 2nd Season, Yumi Aiba
Is the Order a Rabbit??, Rin Mate (Aoyama's Editor)
2016
Active Raid, A-ko
Heavy Object, Lemish
Mobile Suit Gundam: Iron-Blooded Orphans, Nina Miyamori
Undefeated Bahamut Chronicle, L Fajula
Please Tell Me! Galko-chan, Nikuko
Dimension W, Caster, Rose
Age 12: A Little Heart-Pounding, Yui Aoi
Keijo, Midori Morimoto
Kuromukuro, Beth
Mob Psycho 100, Mariko
2017
Seiren, Kyōko Tōno
Is It Wrong to Try to Pick Up Girls in a Dungeon? On the Side: Sword Oratoria, Lefiya Viridis
Altair: A Record of Battles, Gertrud
Nora, Princess, and Stray Cat, Tanaka-chan
Marvel Future Avengers, Chloe
2018
Nil Admirari no Tenbin: Teito Genwaku Kitan, Tsugumi Kuze
Run with the Wind, Hanako Katsuta
2019
Ao-chan Can't Study!, Miyabi Takaoka
Granbelm, Nana Rin

Anime films
Shirobako: The Movie, Aoi Miyamori

Original video animation
Shirobako, The Third Girls Aerial Squad - Elise

Original net animation
Monster Strike, Minami Wakaba
Kare Baka, Akomi Natsuki

Video games
 Azur Lane, Juneau
 Granblue Fantasy, Karva
Thousand Memories 
Fire Emblem Fates, Mozu, Nyx
The Idolmaster Cinderella Girls, Yumi Aiba
Brave Sword × Blaze Soul, Leviathan
Honkai Impact 3rd, Eden
Phantasy Star Online 2 (EPISODE 4), Xiera
Alice Gear Aegis, Rita Henschel
Fire Emblem Echoes: Shadows of Valentia, Yuzu
Fire Emblem Heroes (Feh Channel (2017)), Feh
Lilycle Rainbow Stage!!! (2015) (Yuno Sakuraba)
Higurashi No Naku Koro Ni Mei, Miyabi Saionji

Radio
Shirobako Radio Box

Narration
Kanjani no Shiwake Eight
Welcome! Alexandros

Drama CD
Night Wizard!
Mujaki no Rakuen (Michiko)

Dubbing
 Jurassic World (2017 NTV edition), Mosasaurus Announcer (Courtney James Clark)
 Mad Max: Fury Road (2019 THE CINEMA edition), The Dag (Abbey Lee Kershaw)
Ocean's 8, Eaddy (Eaddy Kiernan)

References

External links
 

 

Year of birth missing (living people)
Living people
Japanese video game actresses
Japanese voice actresses
Tokyo Actor's Consumer's Cooperative Society voice actors
Voice actresses from Fukuoka Prefecture
21st-century Japanese actresses